The following is a list of unproduced J. J. Abrams projects in roughly chronological order. During a career that has spanned over 30 years, J. J. Abrams has worked on projects which never progressed beyond the pre-production stage under his direction.

1980s

Who Framed Roger Rabbit (sequel)

2000s

Superman: Flyby
In July 2002, Abrams wrote a script for a possible fifth Superman film entitled Superman: Flyby. Brett Ratner and McG entered into talks to direct, although Abrams tried to get the chance to direct his own script. However, the project was finally cancelled in 2004, due to Superman Returns.

Early attempt of The Dark Tower

Mystery on Fifth Avenue
In 2008, it was reported that Abrams purchased the rights to a New York Times article Mystery on Fifth Avenue about the renovation of an 8.5 million dollar co-op, a division of property originally owned by E. F. Hutton & Co. and Marjorie Merriweather Post, for six figures and was developing a film titled Mystery on Fifth Avenue, with Paramount Pictures and Bad Robot Productions, and comedy writers Maya Forbes and Wally Wolodarsky to write the adaptation. According to the article, a wealthy couple Steven B. Klinsky and Maureen Sherry purchased the apartment in 2003 and live there with their four children. Soon after purchasing the apartment, they hired young architectural designer Eric Clough, who devised an elaborately clever "scavenger hunt" built into the apartment that involved dozens of historical figures, a fictional book and a soundtrack, woven throughout the apartment in puzzles, riddles, secret panels, compartments, and hidden codes, without the couple's knowledge. The family didn't discover the embedded mystery until months after moving into the apartment. After Abrams purchased the article, Clough left him an encrypted message in the wall tiles of a Christian Louboutin shoe store he designed in West Hollywood.

Hot for Teacher film
On April 24, 2008, it was reported that Abrams and Bad Robot Productions were producing Jay Dyer's script Hot for Teacher.

Untitled Aline Brosh-McKenna/Simon Kinberg film
On October 13, 2009, it was reported that Abrams and Bad Robot Productions were producing a film from writers Aline Brosh McKenna and Simon Kinberg. Since then, there have been no further developments.

Samurai Jack (film)
In November 2009, it was reported that Abrams and Bad Robot Productions were producing, along with Cartoon Network Movies, Warner Bros., Frederator Films, and Paramount Pictures, a film adaptation of Samurai Jack. However, in June 2012, series creator Genndy Tartakovsky stated that the production of the film was scrapped after Abrams' departure from the project to direct Star Trek. For this and other reasons, Tartakovsky decided to make a new season instead of a feature film.

500 Rads film
On 4 November 2009, it was reported that Abrams and Bad Robot Productions would produce 500 Rads, aka an "Absorbed Radiation Dose," from a Jeff Pinkner script. Since then, there have been no further developments.

Micronauts (film)
On November 6, 2009, it was reported that Abrams and Bad Robot Productions would produce a film based on the Micronauts toy line. On October 23, 2015, Tom Wheeler submitted a Micronauts draft to Paramount and Bad Robot. This iteration of the project is unrelated to the Hasbro Cinematic Universe.

Let the Great World Spin film
On December 11, 2009, it was reported that Abrams' Bad Robot Productions and Paramount Pictures were producing the film adaptation of Colum McCann's novel Let the Great World Spin. Since then, there have been no further developments.

2010s

Boilerplate film
In July 2010, Abrams was producing the Boilerplate film.

7 Minutes to Heaven film
On August 10, 2010, Abrams was producing Jake Bender's 7 Minutes to Heaven film.

Untitled Brad Parker/Michael Gilio film
In January 2012, Abrams and Matt Reeves were producing Michael Gilio's action film with Brad Parker on board to direct for Paramount Pictures and Bad Robot.

Untitled Josh Campbell/Matt Stuecken film
In January 2012, Abrams will produce the sci-fi thriller with Josh Campbell and Matt Stuecken for Paramount Pictures and Bad Robot.

Wunderkind film
On June 11, 2012, Abrams was producing Patrick Aison's sci-fi, action, thriller film Wunderkind, for Paramount Pictures and Bad Robot.

Collider film
On July 23, 2012, Abrams was producing Mark Protosevich's sci-fi film Collider, with Edgar Wright directing for Paramount Pictures and Bad Robot.

Earthquake film
On July 27, 2012, Abrams was producing Dustin Lance Black's disaster film Earthquake, for Universal Pictures and Bad Robot.

Electropolis series
On October 11, 2012, Abrams, Bad Robot, Ken Olin, and Warner Bros Television were producing the family drama Electropolis, for The CW.

Portal and Half-Life (films)
Abrams announced at the 2013 D.I.C.E. Summit that Bad Robot Productions had made a deal with Valve to produce a film based on either the video game Portal or Half-Life. In 2021, Abrams announced that the Portal movie was still being worked on with a script currently being written, even expressing interest for J.K. Simmons to reprise his role as Cave Johnson from Portal 2. However, he also confirmed that he was no longer currently involved in a Half-Life adaptation.

One Last Thing Before I Go film
On April 23, 2013, Paramount Pictures and Bad Robot partners Abrams and Bryan Burk were producing the film adaptation of Jonathan Tropper‘s book One Last Thing Before I Go, with Mike Nichols as director and Tropper writing the script. There have been no further developments since Nichols’ death in 2014.

Cycle Of Lies: The Fall Of Lance Armstrong
In 2013, Paramount Pictures and Bad Robot partners JJ Abrams and Bryan Burk were producing a film based on Juliet Macur‘s book Cycle Of Lies: The Fall Of Lance Armstrong with Bradley Cooper in talks to star as Armstrong, and D.V. DeVincentis writing the script. There have been no further developments since then, especially after The Program was released.

The Stops Along the Way series
In June 2013, Abrams was producing the series The Stops Along the Way from an abandoned Rod Serling script for Warner Bros Television. There have been no developments since.

Untitled Chris Alender/Justin Doble film
On 9 December 2014, Abrams and Michael De Luca were producing Chris Alender's sci-fi film with Alender directing and co-writing the script with Justin Doble, as a coproduction between Columbia Pictures and Bad Robot.

Thomas Edison biopic
On 15 February 2015, Abrams was set to produce a biopic about Thomas Edison through Bad Robot, with no word about who will write or direct film.

Killers of the Flower Moon film
On March 10, 2016, Abrams was set to direct the film adaptation of David Grann's Killers of the Flower Moon. In 2021, the book was adapted into a film directed by Martin Scorsese and starring Leonardo DiCaprio, Robert De Niro, Lily Gladstone, and Jesse Plemons.

Dream Jumper film
On April 1, 2016, Abrams was planning on producing the film adaptation of Greg Grunberg's graphic novel Dream Jumper for Paramount Pictures. It is unknown if the project will be live-action or animated and who will write the script.

Kolma film
On April 18, 2016, Abrams was producing Marielle Heller’s film Kolma, a remake of the Israeli film All I’ve Got, with Daisy Ridley in talks to star for Paramount.

Beta film
On 23 June 2016, Abrams was set to produce Ed Solomon’s script Beta, which is said to be combine Solomon’s comedy with Inception and The Matrix, for Paramount.

The Flamingo Affair film
In 29 June 2016, Abrams was planning on directing and producing the animated film The Flamingo Affair from writer Pamela Pettler for Paramount Animation.

The Nix series
In September 2016, Abrams was planning on directing and producing the series The Nix from author Nathan Hill, with Meryl Streep starring and producing.

Glare series
On 9 December 2016, Abrams was producing the Javier Gullón sci-fi TV series Glare through Bad Robot for HBO. There have been no developments since.

Untitled RuPaul bio-series
In March 2017, Abrams was producing a TV series based on RuPaul’s childhood, with RuPaul co-producing and Gary Lennon writing the Hulu series.

The Market TV series
On April 27, 2017, Abrams and Jesse Eisenberg were producing the comedy The Market with Eisenberg starring, writing and directing the series.

Quentin Tarantino's R-rated Star Trek film
It was announced in December 2017 that Quentin Tarantino had pitched an idea to Paramount Pictures for a new Star Trek film. A writers room, consisting of Mark L. Smith, Lindsey Beer, Megan Amram and Drew Pearce, was assembled to flesh out the concept. The plan would be for Tarantino to direct the film, with J. J. Abrams onboard to produce. Smith later became the frontrunner to write the screenplay later that month.

In May 2019, Tarantino confirmed that his Trek film was still in development, saying "It's a very big possibility. I haven't been dealing with those guys for a while cause I've been making my movie. But we've talked about a story and a script. The script has been written and when I emerge my head like Punxsutawney Phil, post-Once Upon a Time in Hollywood, we'll pick up talking about it again." Tarantino discussed the project in June 2019, stating that Smith had turned in his script, and Tarantino would soon be adding in his notes. He asserted his intention for the film to be rated R.

In December 2019, it was reported that Tarantino had left the project, looking to make a smaller budget film. In January 2020, Tarantino stated the film "might" be made, but he would not direct it.

The Heavy film
On May 3, 2018, Abrams was producing Julius Avery’s The Heavy with Daniel Casey writing the script for Paramount.

Piece of Mind film
On May 4, 2018, Abrams was producing Paramount’s adaptation of Michelle Adelman’s Piece of Mind with Ryan Knighton writing the script and Daisy Ridley set to play Lucy.

Aphoria film
On 4 June 2018, Abrams was set to produce the sci-fi film Aphoria, with Jared Moshe writing and directing the film.

Reincarnation Type film
On July 13, 2018, Abrams was producing Robert Specland’s thriller Reincarnation Type and collaborate with Bristol Automotive.

A Hope More Powerful Than the Sea film
On October 29, 2018, Abrams and Steven Spielberg were co-producing the film adaptation of Melissa Fleming‘s A Hope More Powerful than the Sea about Doaa Al Zamel‘s escape from the Syrian Civil War, with Lena Dunham writing the script.

Untitled Ed Hemming Thriller
On November 8, 2018, Abrams was producing Ed Hemming’s untitled thriller.

They Both Die at the End TV series
On February 13, 2019, Bad Robot was producing the adaptation of Adam Silvera's book They Both Die at the End with Chris Kelly creating the series with Abrams for HBO.

2020s

Overlook TV series
On April 14, 2020, Abrams and his production company Bad Robot was producing Overlook, a prequel to The Shining based on Stephen King's Before the Play, and explore the tales of the Overlook Hotel, for HBO Max. However, in August 2021, it was announced that the show would not go forward at HBO Max.

Demimonde TV Series
In February 2018, HBO ordered Abrams' sci-fi drama Demimonde to series. On June 7, 2022, it was announced the project would no longer be moving forward.

References

Lists of unrealized projects by artist
Unrealized projects